David Paparusso, better known by his stage name David Vendetta (born 25 August 1968 in Longwy), is a French dance producer and DJ.

Biography 
David Vendetta's career as a professional DJ only starts in 2002. At that time, he meets Antoine Clamaran, another popular French DJ, who produces Vendetta's first three maxi singles "Fiction – No Sex", "She Loves Me – Party People" and "Alicante – Cleopatra". He also starts working as a producer when American DJ Roger Sanchez asks him to remix some of his songs.

In 2006, Vendetta releases the song "Love to love you baby", which samples Donna Summer, and manages to peak at No. 20 at the French Singles Chart. The follow-up single "Unidos para la música" even reaches the Top 5 in France and the Top 30 in Belgium-Wallonia.

In addition to his work as a producer, Vendetta also animates a weekly radio show on FG DJ Radio and organizes parties in Ibiza, New York City, Moscow, Marrakech and many other cities.

In April 2010, he returned with his second album Vendetta. It includes collaborations with artists such as Haifa Wehbe, Tara McDonald and Alim Qasimov.

Lawsuit against Mickaël Vendetta
In the beginning of 2010, David Vendetta filed a lawsuit against French internet phenomenon Mickaël Vendetta for unfair business practices, saying: "This guy is an impostor, a troublemaker. He only used my name to become popular". He asked for 100.000 euros in damages; however, he lost and was condemned to pay Mickaël Vendetta's 3,000 euro lawyer fees.

Discography

Studio albums

Singles
 2003: Party People
 2003: She Loves Me
 2004: No Sex
 2004: Fiction
 2004: Alicante
 2004: Cleopatra
 2006: Love To Love You Baby (FR: No. 20 / Be-Wa: No. 30 / NL: #65)
 2007: Unidos Para La Musica (FR: No. 5 / Be-Wa: #30)
 2007: Break 4 Love (FR: No. 17 / Be-Wa: No. 17 / Fi: #14)
 2007: Bleeding Heart
 2008: Hold That Sucker Down (FR: No. 17 / Be-Wa: #12)
 2008: Freaky Girl
 2009: Anticipation (with Barbara Tucker)
 2009: I Hope She Turns Around to see me (feat. Brian Lucas)
 2010: I Am Your Goddess (feat. Tara McDonald & Alim) (Produced by Boris Abdul of www.mamedia.eu.com)
 2010: Can You Feel It (feat. Brian Lucas)
 2010: Make Boys Cry (feat. Luciana)
 2010: She Turns Around To See Me
 2010: Yama Layali (Many Nights) (feat. Haifa Wahbi)

References

External links 
 Official homepage
 Official myspace site

Living people
1968 births
Club DJs
French dance musicians
French DJs
Electronic dance music DJs